Merta Sterling (June 13, 1883 – March 14, 1944) was an American film actress of the silent era who predominantly appeared in comedic roles. She appeared in more than 60 films between 1914 and 1927. She was born Manitowoc, Wisconsin and died in Hollywood, California.

Selected filmography

References

External links

1883 births
1944 deaths
American film actresses
American silent film actresses
Actresses from Wisconsin
People from Manitowoc, Wisconsin
20th-century American actresses